{{DISPLAYTITLE:C12H8O}}
The molecular formula C12H8O (molar mass: 178.27 g/mol, exact mass: 178.1358 u) may refer to:

 Capillin
 Dibenzofuran